The 1905 Svenska Mästerskapet was the tenth season of Svenska Mästerskapet, the football Cup to determine the Swedish champions. Örgryte IS won the tournament by defeating IFK Stockholm in the final with a 2–1 score.

First qualifying round

Second qualifying round

First round

Quarter-finals

Semi-finals

Final

Notes

References 

Print

1905
Svenska
Mas